Early Popular Visual Culture is a peer-reviewed academic journal published quarterly by Routledge, which focuses on the study of the visual arts prior to 1930.

Taylor & Francis academic journals
Quarterly journals
English-language journals
Art history journals